35 Biggest Hits is a two-disc greatest hits album from American country music artist Toby Keith. It was released on May 6, 2008. The album comprises thirty-four previously recorded tracks (18 tracks on Disc 1 and 17 on Disc 2) from Keith's previous studio albums, as well as the newly recorded track "She's a Hottie", which was released to radio in early 2008.

This compilation is the first to span Keith's entire career; it was able to do so because Universal Music Group Nashville owned (either outright or through distribution) the rights to his entire catalog.  The album has sold 1,210,900 copies in the United States as of January 2017.

Track listing

Disc 1

Disc 2

Charts

Weekly charts

Year-end charts

References

Toby Keith compilation albums
2008 greatest hits albums
Mercury Records compilation albums
Show Dog-Universal Music compilation albums